Sammy Oziti (born 1 January 1983) is a Nigerian freestyle wrestler. She won two medals at the All-African Games between 2003 and 2007. She obtained six medals in the African Championship between 2006 and 2012. She also won two silver medals at the Commonwealth Wrestling Championship in 2005 and 2013.

Sports career 
Sammy Oziti started her wrestling career in 1998. Her first ever participation at the Africa Games was in the year 2003 in Abuja. At the event, she won a gold medal after defeating her opponent, Bejaoui, Nour El Houda of Tunisia. The following year, she participated in the Olympic Qualification Tournament however ended up in 9th position.

In 2005, Sammy competed in her first Commonwealth Wrestling Championship at Stellenbosch, South Africa. She came in second and won a silver medal, her opponent was Meena from India.

At the African Wrestling Championship in 2006, She won the gold medal having defeated Feten, Ghanmi in the 48 kg event held in Pretoria, RSA. The following year she participated again in the same championship and came in second after Sambou, Isabella from Senegal. She also won a silver medal at the African Games that was held same year in Algeir. In 2008, Sammy participated in another African Wrestling Championship where she ended up gaining another silver medal from the 48 kg event.

At the 2010, she yet competed and won a silver medal. At the 2011 and 2012 African Championship, Sammy earned 2 bronze medals. Her victory in 2012 led to her participation at the Olympic Qualification Tournament where she was ranked 3rd place after competing in the 48 kg category.

In 2013, she was at the Commonwealth Championship that took place in Johannesburg, RSA, and came in second after Nirmala Devi from India. They competed in the 48 kg event and Sammy took home the silver medal.

References 

Nigerian female sport wrestlers
Female wrestlers
Amateur wrestlers
1983 births
Living people
Competitors at the 2003 All-Africa Games
Competitors at the 2007 All-Africa Games
African Games gold medalists for Nigeria
African Games silver medalists for Nigeria
African Games medalists in wrestling
21st-century Nigerian women